The 2010 Absa Currie Cup Premier Division was the 72nd season in the competition since it started in 1889. The competition was contested from 9 July through to 30 October.

Patrick Lambie was named man-of-the-match for his tally of 25 points, the second highest total scored by an individual in a Currie Cup Final.

Teams

Standings

Fixtures and results
 Fixtures are subject to change.
 All times are South African (GMT+2).

Regular season

Round one

Round two

Round three

Round four

Round Five

Round Six

Round Seven

Round Eight

Round Nine

Round Ten

Round Eleven

Round Twelve

Round Thirteen

Round Fourteen

Semi-finals

Final

See also
 2010 Currie Cup First Division
 Currie Cup
 ABSA

References

External links
 Latest Currie Cup News
 
 Match Attendance
 

 
2010
2010 in South African rugby union
2010 rugby union tournaments for clubs